SS El Oriente was a cargo ship built in 1910 for the Morgan Line, a subsidiary of the Southern Pacific Company. During World War I, she was known as USS El Oriente (ID-4504) in service with the United States Navy. At the end of war, she reverted to her original name of SS El Oriente. During World War II she was chartered by the International Committee of the Red Cross (ICRC) as SS Henri Dunant (sometimes also spelled Henry Dunant), but reverted to her original name of SS El Oriente at the end of the charter.

SS El Oriente was one of four sister ships that carried cargo and a limited number of passengers for the Morgan Line. She was acquired by the U.S. Navy in July 1918, and converted to carry horses and mules to France, and after the Armistice, was converted again to carry American troops home from Europe.

El Oriente returned to the Morgan Line in 1919 and sailed with them until June 1941, when the entire Morgan Line fleet was purchased by the United States Maritime Commission. El Oriente served as a civilian-crewed cargo ship during World War II, sailing primarily between the United States and the United Kingdom. In September 1944, she was chartered by the ICRC and sailed under the Swiss flag carrying food parcels to American prisoners of war held in German camps. Henri Dunant continued to sail under Swiss charter until October 1945, when she was returned to the United States and reverted to her former name. El Oriente was placed in the James River Reserve Fleet in November 1945, and was sold for scrapping in July 1946.

Early career 
SS El Oriente was a cargo and passenger steamship launched on 11 May 1910 by the Newport News Shipbuilding and Dry Dock Co. of Newport News, Virginia (yard no. 132), and delivered to the Atlantic division of the Morgan Line on 24 October 1910. The vessel sailed for the Morgan Line, the brand name of the Southern Pacific Steamship Company (a subsidiary of the Southern Pacific Railroad), which employed her to carry cargo and a limited number of passengers between New York; New Orleans, the eastern terminus of the Southern Pacific line; and Galveston, Texas.

World War I 
After the United States declared war on Germany in April 1917, it's unclear what role, if any, El Oriente played early on in the war. If El Oriente were used by the Army as an animal transport ship, she would have needed a refit which typically meant that any second- or third-class passenger accommodations had to be ripped out and replaced with ramps and stalls for the horses and mules carried.

The next recorded activity of El Oriente was on 29 July, when she was acquired by the U.S. Navy and commissioned the same day.

El Oriente's first Navy voyage to France began when she sailed from Newport News with 500 animals on 11 August. Unlike earlier animal transport crossings for the Army, where there was as much as a 4% mortality rate, the voyages in August 1918 and after carried a transport veterinarian and a permanent veterinary detachment to care for the animals while on board the ship. As part of this new program, El Oriente delivered her full load of horses and mules— suffering no losses—at Bordeaux on 2 September. El Oriente made an additional roundtrip with 500 more animals in October, losing only three of her equine cargo during the voyage. El Oriente continued sailing for the NOTS through April 1919, sometimes carrying a small number of troops on return voyages to the United States. At that time El Oriente was converted to carry troops, and assigned to the Cruiser and Transport Force to help return larger numbers American servicemen from Europe.

She sailed on 11 June for Bordeaux and returned with officers and men of the 6th Cavalry Regiment on 4 July. She made additional voyages in July and August, returning 978 members of the 3rd Infantry Division to Philadelphia on the latter voyage. In all, El Oriente returned 2,986 healthy and wounded American servicemen from France in three voyages. On 15 September at Philadelphia, El Orente was decommissioned, and returned to the Morgan Line soon after.

Interwar civilian service 
El Oriente resumed cargo service with the Morgan Line, and enjoyed a quiet career, typically sailing between New York and Galveston. One event of note occurred in February 1922 when El Oriente came upon the wreck of the schooner, Caldwell H. Colt, which had run aground on a reef near the Tortugas Light during a gale. When El Oriente came upon the hulk, only her captain remained alive, surviving without food or water for several days before his rescue. El Oriente continued on to Galveston and landed the man there.

World War II 
In June 1941, the United States Maritime Commission (USMC) announced that it had requisitioned the entire Morgan Line fleet of ten ships, including El Oriente and her remaining sister ships, El Occidente and El Mundo. The ships were to finish previously scheduled cargo runs and be handed over to the USMC over the following six weeks. The USMC had been charged with assembling a  U.S. fleet to "aid the democracies" fighting Germany in World War II, and paid $4.7 million for the ships and a further $2.6 million for repairs and refits.

El Oriente was handed over to the USMC and assigned to United States Lines, Inc., for operation. The cargo ship was placed under Panamanian registry by U.S. Lines. Little is known of El Oriente's movements over the next eight months, but on 17 February El Oriente sailed from Houston, Texas, to Philadelphia and on to Reykjavík. From Reykjavík, she sailed to the Clyde, arriving there at the end of July. Over the next 5 months, El Oriente sailed around the British Isles, calling at Kirkwall, Belfast Lough, Barrow-in-Furness, and Liverpool, and back to Clyde in late December. From there, she sailed on one trip to Murmansk where she arrived on 27 January 1943.

Murmansk had limited port facilities and slow unloading of cargo (often performed by Soviet women and political prisoners), which, coupled with inclement weather and long waits for convoy escorts, often required lengthy stays by Allied cargo ships. El Oriente was no exception, staying in Murmansk for nearly five weeks. German dive bombers would silently glide in below Soviet anti-aircraft fire, drop their payloads, and fly away. El Oriente was caught in one such attack on 27 February, with four of the ship's Naval Armed Guards men killed in the attack.

El Oriente departed Kola Inlet on 1 March and returned to Liverpool, from which she sailed in a convoy for New York on 6 April, and returned to Belfast Lough in late June. After calling at Barry and Milford Haven, El Oriente began two roundtrips to New York at the end of June. In October the ship visited Loch Ewe, Methil, and Immingham before returning to New York again in November. After another transatlantic crossing and circuit amongst British ports, El Oriente returned to New York in May 1944.

In June, the cargo vessel sailed to Cuba, calling at Havana and Puerto Tarafa before returning to New York. She next sailed to La Guaira, Venezuela; Maracaibo, Venezuela; and Júcaro, Cuba, before returning to New York in mid August. El Oriente sailed to Philadelphia in mid September in preparation for a charter.

Red Cross ship 
On 28 September 1944, El Oriente was chartered by the International Committee of the Red Cross, reflagged as a Swiss ship, and renamed SS Henry Dunant (sometimes erroneously spelled as Henri Dunant), after Red Cross movement founder Henry Dunant. She was last of 14 ships chartered by Swiss interests to sail under the Swiss flag during World War II. On 5 October, Henry Dunant departed Philadelphia with a cargo of mail and 900,000 food parcels intended for Allied prisoners of war interned in German camps.

Henry Dunant continued sailing for the ICRC through 24 October 1945. The ship returned to Norfolk, resumed her former name of El Oriente, and entered the James River Reserve Fleet on 7 November 1945. On 3 July 1946, El Oriente was sold for scrapping to the Patapsco Scrap Co., of Baltimore, Maryland, for $12,175.

Notes

References

Bibliography

External links 
 

Ocean liners
World War I passenger ships of the United States
World War I auxiliary ships of the United States
Transport ships of the United States Army
World War II auxiliary ships of the United States
Steamships of Switzerland
1910 ships
Cargo ships of the United States Navy
Ships built in Newport News, Virginia